Teva Victor (born September 30, 1971, Bora Bora) is a tahitian sculptor living in Punaauia. He is the son of famous explorer Paul-Emile Victor. In 2016, Victor created a massive stone sculpture which sits in the hall of the Grand Theatre de la Maison de la Culture in Papeete, Tahiti.  In 2017 he made an 800 kilo stone representation of Queen Pomare IV which is installed in the Queen’s gardens in Papeete, Tahiti. His art reflects his life philosophy: "Nothing can match the beauty of nature. We are only there to bring a nod to our passage."

References

Living people
French sculptors
Tahitian artists
1971 births